The Western Ontario Hockey League (WOHL) was a junior ice hockey league in Ontario, Canada, sanctioned by the Ontario Hockey Association from 1969 until 2007.  In 2007, the league became a division of the newly formed Greater Ontario Junior Hockey League along with the Mid-Western Junior Hockey League and Golden Horseshoe Junior Hockey League.

History
The Western had been a part of the Big '10' until 1956, when the Eastern and Western conference were split into separate leagues—the Eastern becoming the Central, the Western becoming the Western League.

In 1968, the St. Thomas Barons, Sarnia Legionnaires, Guelph Imperials, Chatham Maroons and Brantford Foresters broke away from the Ontario Hockey Association to form a Junior "A" League known as the Western Ontario Junior A Hockey League.  A year later, the OHA pulled together a bunch of local teams (the Waterloo Siskins, Stratford Warriors, Sarnia Bees, St.Marys Lincolns and the London Squires) as well as the return of the Strathroy Rockets (who had joined the Central Junior B league for a season) and formed a new Western Ontario Junior "B" Hockey League.

According to the WOJHL history, a re-organization of Ontario's Jr. B hockey teams occurred prior to the 1978/79 with the folding of the short lived Southwestern Junior B Hockey League and the Mid-Ontario Junior B Hockey League.  The realignment meant that the OHA had consolidated the Southern Ontario region from 7 to 5 Junior "B" leagues. Although this marks the birth of the modern Western Ontario Jr. B league, the teams in the league did not change.  In 1989, the Metro league went renegade and eventually became a Tier II Junior "A" league.  In 1993, the Central league was promoted to Tier II Junior "A" as well.  Since then, the OHA has operated with 3 Junior "B" leagues, but due to the talent level of these 3 league there has been a recent push to bring all three leagues to the Tier II Junior "A" level and allow for a new realignment.

From 1999 until 2001, the league changed its name to the Greater Ontario Hockey League in an attempt to drop the "Junior B" designation .  The league has since referred to itself as the Western Ontario Hockey League.

In 2007, the WOHL merged with the Mid-Western Junior Hockey League and the Golden Horseshoe Junior Hockey League to become the Greater Ontario Junior Hockey League.

Final teams
These are the teams that were in the league during its final independent season (2006-07).
Chatham Maroons
Leamington Flyers
London Nationals
Petrolia Jets
St. Marys Lincolns
St. Thomas Stars
Sarnia Blast
Strathroy Rockets
Tecumseh Chiefs

Other former members
Aylmer Aces
Belle River Bulldogs
Michigan Americans
Port Huron Flags
Stratford Warriors

Playoff Champions

Records
Records taken from Official Website.
Best record: 1981-82 Sarnia Bees (36-4-2)
Worst record: 1988-89 Tillsonburg Titans (1-39-2)
Largest margin of victory: Leamington Flyers 30 - Windsor Bulldogs 3 on January 20, 1995
Most goals, one season: Bill Lochead (73) -- 1970-71 Sarnia Bees
Most assists, one season: Brian Wiseman (77) -- 1989-90 Chatham Maroons / Greg Day (77) -- 1996-97 Tecumseh Chiefs
Most points, one season: Brian Wiseman (147) -- 1989-90 Chatham Maroons
Most goals, career: Brent Rumble (137) -- 1995-99 Chatham Maroons
Most assists, career: Brian Wiseman (179) -- 1987-90 Chatham Maroons
Most points, career: Jason Baclig (324) -- 1998-2003 Leamington Flyers
Most penalty minutes, season: Shawn Harris (408) -- 1994-95 Sarnia Bees
Most penalty minutes, career: Tim Lantz (859) -- 1997-2000 Leamington Flyers
Most wins by goalie, season: Scott Talbot (29) -- 2002-03 Sarnia Blast
Most shutouts, season: Kyle Funkenhauser (8) -- 2005-06 Chatham Maroons
Most games played by goalie, career: Paul Gibson (132) -- 2000-07 St. Thomas Stars
Most wins by goalie, career: Paul Gibson (66) -- 2000-07 St. Thomas Stars
Most shutouts, career: Kyle Funkenhauser (12) -- 2004-06 Chatham Maroons

External links
WOHL Website
OHA Website

Defunct ice hockey leagues in Ontario